Pekka Juhani Aittakumpu (born 30 June 1981 in Oulu) is a Finnish Lutheran priest and politician currently serving in the Parliament of Finland for the Centre Party at the Oulu constituency.

References

1981 births
Living people
People from Oulu
21st-century Finnish Lutheran clergy
Centre Party (Finland) politicians
Members of the Parliament of Finland (2019–23)